Salento is dotted with watchtowers sighting since always has been the subject of numerous attacks by different populations of the Mediterranean. We do not know what was the first time when these towers were built, some might even refer to Norman, but there is no supporting evidence. For the present appearance, most of the coastal towers still present are to report to the 15th and 16th century.

Many of these towers are now in very poor conditions.

This is the list in a clockwise direction from the province of Brindisi and culminating in the Province of Taranto.

Province of Brindisi

Province of Lecce

Province of Taranto

See also
 List of lighthouses in Italy

Salento
Salento
Salento
Buildings and structures in Apulia